The Laureus World Sports Award for Breakthrough of the Year (known as the Laureus World Sports Award for Newcomer of the Year prior to 2007) is an annual award honouring the achievements of those individuals or teams who have made a breakthrough performance in the world of sports. It was first awarded in 2000 as one of the seven constituent awards presented during the Laureus World Sports Awards. The awards are presented by the Laureus Sport for Good Foundation, a global organisation involved in more than 150 charity projects supporting 500,000 young people. The first ceremony was held on 25 May 2000 in Monte Carlo, at which Nelson Mandela gave the keynote speech. , a shortlist of six nominees for the award comes from a panel composed of the "world's leading sports editors, writers and broadcasters". The Laureus World Sports Academy then selects the individual winner or winning team who is presented with a Laureus statuette, created by Cartier, at an annual awards ceremony held in various locations around the world. The awards are considered highly prestigious and are frequently referred to as the sporting equivalent of "Oscars".

The inaugural winner of the award was the Spanish golfer Sergio García. During his debut season as a professional, the 19-year-old finished one stroke behind Tiger Woods at the 1999 PGA Championship and became the youngest player to gain selection for Team Europe for the Ryder Cup. , the award has been won by a different individual sportsperson every year (four to women, sixteen to men), although eight teams have been nominated – Ghana men's national football team (2007), VfL Wolfsburg (2010), Afghanistan men's national cricket team (2014), Switzerland Davis Cup team (2015), Chile men's national football team (2016), Fiji national rugby sevens team (2017), Iceland national football team (2017) and Leicester City F.C. (2017). British and Spanish sportspeople have won more awards than any other nationality with four, followed by Americans, Germans and Chinese with two. Golfers are the most successful overall with six wins followed by Formula One drivers with five. The winner in 2017 was the German Formula One driver Nico Rosberg. Having beaten teammate Lewis Hamilton to the 2016 World Championship title by five points, Rosberg announced his retirement from the sport five days later, two months prior to collecting his Laureus statuette.  The 2022 winner of the Laureus World Sports Award for Breakthrough of the Year was British tennis player Emma Raducanu.

List of winners and nominees

Statistics
Statistics are correct as of 2022 winners.

References

Breakthrough of the Year
Awards established in 2000